Mark Read may refer to:
 Mark Read (bookmaker), Australian bookmaker of the 1980s
 Mark Read (singer) (born 1978), British singer/songwriter, member of the boy band a1
 Mark "Chopper" Read (1954–2013) Australian celebrity criminal
 Mary Read (1685–1721), Caribbean pirate in her masculine guise

See also 
 Mark Reid (born 1961), retired Scottish footballer
 Mark Reed (disambiguation)